Electoral history of Sarah Palin, Governor of Alaska (2006-2009) and Republican vice presidential nominee in the 2008 United States presidential election.

National elections
2008 United States presidential election
 Barack Obama/Joe Biden (D) - 69,498,516 (53%) and 365 electoral votes (28 states, NE-02, and D.C. carried)
 John McCain/Sarah Palin (R) - 59,948,323 (46%) and 173 electoral votes (22 states carried)

Alaska statewide races

Wasilla mayoral races

Wasilla City Council races

See also
 Electoral history of Joe Biden
 Electoral history of John McCain
 Electoral history of Barack Obama
 Electoral history of Kamala Harris

References

1992 Alaska elections
1996 Alaska elections
2002 Alaska elections
2006 Alaska elections
Palin, Sarah
Sarah Palin